Poco Mandasawu is a lava dome of Ranakah located in the south-central part of the island of Flores, Indonesia. It is the highest point of the island.

References

Sources
 Peakbagger
 Ranakah, Synonyms and subfeatures

Mandasawu